Danto Engineering Development Center is an academic learning center is attached to the College of Engineering building at Wayne State University. It is Located at 5050 Anthony Street in Detroit, Michigan on the Wayne State main campus, and it is across the street from the Physics Building.

History 
The Marvin Danto Engineering Development Center at Wayne State University is an addition to the previous Engineering Building that is located on the main campus in Midtown Detroit. In late 2006, 89-year-old Wayne State College of Engineering alumnus and Detroit philanthropist Marvin L. Danto donated $ 3 million to augment state funds. These funds were the seed money the college needed to make the construction of the center possible. The rest of the funds needed came from the state and other private investors. In May 2007 Wayne State University broke ground on the $27.3 million engineering facility which at the time represented a whole states economy’s future based on biotech innovation, sustainable energy technology, and other high-tech industries. The engineering center was completed in the fall of 2008, 4 years before Marvin L. Danto’s death in 2012. In April 2012 the Danto Engineering Development Center received the LEED (Leadership in Energy and Environmental Design) Silver certification, which was given by the U.S. Green Building Council; Wayne State University in unveiled a plaque in recognition of this achievement.

Overview 
The three-story building holds nano-science and alternative energy technology, educational programs, research programs in smart sensors (which received a $1.8 million grant from the U.S. Department of Defense to develop and build a sensor to monitor the chemical pollutants in drinking water, micro-systems for artificial vision, and real-time cancer detection), and biotechnology. The building also provides engineering services for private companies. "The Danto center also [houses] a high-performance computing lab to study energy efficiency, funded in part with a grant of large mainframe computers from Sun Microsystems”. The building also holds the meeting place and offices for the Endowed Chair of Engineering Ventures, the Associate Dean of Engineering, the Wayne State University chapter of the Collegiate Entrepreneurs Organization, which is an organization that guides students to consider a career as an entrepreneur, and the Engineering Student Faculty Board. In the center, students have their own studios to design, build and test projects and entries for engineering competitions. The Formula SAE racecar team was a former inhabitant of this area.

Project manager and design team 
Wayne State University selected Christman Company to oversee and provide construction management services for the $27.3 million engineering center. James Sears, the Wayne State University associate vice president for facilities planning and management at the time stated,"With its proven planning expertise and strong background in construction of similar high-technology facilities and planning expertise, Christman was our number one choice as construction partner for this project". Christman Company lastly, provided many engineering options that in turn improved operational value for Wayne State. GHAFARI Associates of Dearborn, Michigan, were selected as the design team for the project. They were selected specifically to provide the architectural and engineering pre-construction planning for the center, and to manage the costs at different stages of the design process to ensure easy collaboration with the project budget set by the University. A major aspect of the actual design that GHAFARI incorporated is the large courtyard outside the Wayne State’s College of Engineering building the purpose was to merge the new building with the existing space.

References 

Wayne State University